Antonín Hájek (12 February 1987 – September 2022) was a Czech ski jumper. His specialties included both individual ski jumping and ski flying. Hájek's best result in the World Cup was a fourth place in Tauplitz and Sapporo in 2010.

Hájek had an accident in Oberstdorf in 2005, crashing in the trial round; he did not suffer major injuries and walked from the hill by himself.

Hájek was involved in a car accident during the spring of 2008, and barely survived. Four months after the accident he could not walk, ruling out a comeback. But he began to train again in February 2009, and made great progress during the summer of 2009. He staged his comeback in Continental Cup in Rovaniemi in December 2009. His first World Cup competition after his comeback was in Tauplitz on 9 January 2010, and his fourth place score on that day was his best World Cup result to date. Hájek jumped 236 m at Planica on 20 March 2010 at the ski flying World Championships; this was the third longest jump in ski jumping history.

Hájek's results from the 2010 Winter Olympics were seventh in both the individual and team large hill events, and 21st in the individual normal hill event. His best finish at the FIS Nordic World Ski Championships was ninth in the team large hill event at Sapporo in 2007.

Hájek retired in September 2015 because of unsatisfying results and health problems.

On 10 March 2023, the Czech Ski Association announced that Hájek had been found dead in Malaysia. It was subsequently confirmed that he went missing in Langkawi, and died in September 2022, at the age of 35.

References

External links
 
 Photo of Hajek's crash

1987 births
2022 deaths
Czech male ski jumpers
Olympic ski jumpers of the Czech Republic
Ski jumpers at the 2010 Winter Olympics
Ski jumpers at the 2014 Winter Olympics
People from Frýdlant
Sportspeople from the Liberec Region